Antoinette de Maignelais (1434–1474) was the chief mistress of Charles VII of France from 1450 until his death.  The Baroness of Villequier by marriage, she replaced her cousin Agnès Sorel as the king's favourite mistress after Sorel's sudden death in 1450.  Later in life she was the mistress of Francis II, Duke of Brittany.  She acted as the spy on Charles VII on behalf of his son, Louis XI.

Life
Antoinette was the daughter of Jean II de Maignelais and Marie de Jouy.  Through her father she was a first cousin of Agnès Sorel, who served Charles VII as his titular mistress from roughly 1441 until her sudden death in 1450.

Even before her cousin's death, Antoinette had caught the king's eye.  In 1448, when she was fourteen years old, he gave her the lands of Maignelais, which had been the object of a long lawsuit between her ancestor Raoul de Maignelais and the Duke de Bourbon.  In the end, the estate had remained in the duke's possession.

Royal Mistress
In her sixteenth year, shortly after Agnès died, Antoinette became the royal mistress of Charles VII. In connection to this, Charles VII married Antoinette to his first gentleman of the bedchamber, André, Baron de Villequier (d. 1454), of Guerche in Touraine.  On this occasion the king presented Antoinette with the isles of Oleron, Marennes, and Arvert as a marriage portion, with a pension of 6,000 livres a year for life. The letters granting these advantages are dated October, 1450. For her and her husband, the king ordered the construction of the Château de la Guerche.

In 1458, Charles presented her daughter, Jeanne de Maignelais, with 8,250 francs upon her marriage to the Sire of Rochefort.  Antoinette also had another daughter.  Charles VII acknowledged neither daughter.

During her tenure as royal mistress in France, Antoinette co-operated with the Dauphin (the future Louis XI of France) with whom the King was in a strained relationship, and informed the Dauphin about his father, thus in effect acting as the spy of the Dauphin upon the King.

Ducal mistress

When the king died in 1461, Antoinette became the mistress of Francis II, Duke of Brittany.  She was given a great allowance from the Duke, and resided in the Castle of Cholet, where she hosted a cultural circle and made her court a center of culture in Brittany. She eventually had five children with Francis II.

When becoming mistress of the Duke of Brittany, Louis XI of France expected her to continue to act as his spy, this time upon the Duke of Brittany. Initially, she did fulfil this expectation, but eventually, she changed her loyalties. During the war between France and Brittany, Antoinette de Maignelais sold her jewels to finance the army of Brittany against France.  Upon hearing of this, Louis XI of France confiscated her property in France.

She died peacefully at Francis II's court in 1474.

Notes

References

Sources
 
 
 

1420 births
1474 deaths
Antoinette
Antoinette
Mistresses of French royalty
French baronesses
French courtiers
15th-century French people
15th-century French women
Medieval spies